John Kettle (3 December 1830 – 30 October 1891) was an Australian cricketer. He played three first-class matches for New South Wales between 1859/60 and 1861/62.

See also
 List of New South Wales representative cricketers

References

External links
 

1830 births
1891 deaths
Australian cricketers
New South Wales cricketers
Cricketers from Sydney